Niveria maltbiana is a species of small sea snail, a marine gastropod mollusk in the family Triviidae, the false cowries or trivias.

Distribution

Description 
The maximum recorded shell length is 13 mm.

Habitat 
Minimum recorded depth is 2 m. Maximum recorded depth is 91 m.

References

Triviidae
Gastropods described in 1942